was the 113th emperor of Japan, according to the traditional order of succession. Higashiyama's reign spanned the years from 1687 through to his abdication in 1709 corresponding to the Genroku era. The previous hundred years of peace and seclusion in Japan had created relative economic stability. The arts flourished, including theater and architecture.

Events of Higashiyama's life

Early life
Tomohito was born on October 21, 1675 and was the fifth son of Emperor Reigen; his birth mother was a lady-in-waiting named Matsuki Muneko. While Prince Tomohito was the son of a secondary consort, he was adopted by empress Takatsukasa Fusako (chief consort or Chūgū). Tomohito's Imperial family lived with him in the Dairi of the Heian Palace. Events that took place before Tomohito became Crown Prince include a great flood that devastated Edo, a great famine that devastated Kyoto, and the Great Tenna Fire in Edo. The Shingon Buddhist temple Gokoku-ji was also founded in Edo where it remains today as one of the few sites in Tokyo that survived World War II. Tomohito-shinnō was proclaimed Crown prince in 1682, and given the pre-accession title of Go-no-miya (五宮). For the first time in over 300 years a ceremonial investiture was held for the occasion. A fire burned the Kyoto Imperial Palace to ashes in 1684 prompting reconstruction that took a year to complete. The effects from this fire on the Imperial family, if any, are unknown. Emperor Reigen's brother, former-Emperor Go-Sai, died on March 26, 1685 and a great comet was observed crossing the night sky.

Reign
Prince Tomohito acceded to the throne on May 2, 1687 as Emperor when his father abdicated in his favor, the era's name was changed from Jōkyō to Genroku to mark this event. While he held the political title of Emperor, it was in name only as the shoguns of the Tokugawa family controlled Japan. Initially, Emperor Reigen continued to rule in Higashiyama's name as a Cloistered Emperor as had been done in the Heian period. While this move caused trouble by provoking the ruling shogunate, Higashiyama's gentle character helped to improve relations with the Shōgun. This warmed relationship caused imperial property to be increased, and repairs carried out on Imperial mausoleums. Reigen meanwhile lived out his retirement in the Sentō-gosho (the palace for an ex-Emperor), and is now known for being the last "Cloistered Emperor" of Japan. On December 20, 1688 the esoteric Daijō-sai ceremony was revived because of the shogunate's insistence. This Shinto ritual had been in abeyance for over a century, and is performed only once by the emperor in the period of the enthronement ceremonies.

 1688 (Genroku gannen): The Tokugawa shogunate revised the code of conduct for funerals (Fuku-kiju-ryō), which incorporated a code of conduct for mourning as well.
 September 16, 1689 (Genroku 2): German physician Engelbert Kaempfer arrives at Dejima for the first time.  Bakufu policy in this era was designed to marginalize the influence of foreigners; and Kaempfer had to present himself as "Dutch" in dealings with the Japanese. Regardless of this minor subterfuge, an unintended and opposite consequence of sakoku was to enhance the value and significance of a very small number of thoughtful observers like Kaempfer, whose writings document what he learned or discovered first-hand. Kaempfer's published accounts and unpublished writings provided a unique and useful perspective for Orientalists and Japanologists in the 19th century; and his work continues to be rigorously examined by modern researchers today.
 1695 (Genroku 8, 8th month): Minting begun of Genroku coinage. The shogunate placed the Japanese character gen (元) on the obverse of copper coins, the same character used today in China for the yuan.  There is no connection between those uses, however.
 1695 (Genroku 8, 11th month): First kennel is established for stray dogs in Edo.
 1697 (Genroku 10): The fourth official map of Japan was made in this year, but it was considered to be inferior to the previous one—which had been ordered in 1605 (Shōhō 1) and completed in 1639 (Kan'ei 16).  This Genroku map was corrected in 1719 (Kyōhō 4) by the mathematician Tatebe Katahiro (1644–1739), using high mountain peaks as points of reference, and was drawn to a scale of 1:21,600.
 1697 (Genroku 10): Great fire in Edo.
 1697 (Genroku 11): Another great fire in Edo. A new hall is constructed inside the enclosure of the Edo temple of Kan'ei-ji (which is also known as Tōeizan Kan'ei-ji or "Hiei-san of the east" after the principal temple of the Tendai Buddhist sect—that is to say, after the temple of Enryaku-ji at Mount Hiei near to Heian-kyō).
 1703 (Genroku 15, 14th day of the 12th month): when the Akō Incident took place, in which a band of Forty-seven rōnin (leaderless samurai) avenged the death of their master Asano Naganori, due to the bloodshed, Emperor Higashiyama nearly withdrew the imperial will.
 1703 (Genroku 16, 5th month): First performance of Chikamatsu Monzaemon's play The Love Suicides at Sonezaki.
 1703 (Genroku 16, 28th day of the 11th month): The Great Genroku earthquake shook Edo and parts of the shōguns castle collapsed.  The following day,  a vast fire spread throughout the city.  Parts of Honshū's coast were battered by tsunami, and 200,000 people were either killed or injured.
 October 28, 1707 (Hōei 4, 14th day of the 10th month): 1707 Hōei earthquake. The city of Osaka suffers tremendously because of a very violent earthquake.
 November 15, 1707 (Hōei 4, 22nd day of the 10th month): An eruption of Mount Fuji; cinders and ash fell like rain in Izu, Kai, Sagami, and Musashi.
 1708 (Hōei 5): The shogunate introduces new copper coins into circulation; and each coin is marked with the Hōei nengō name (Hōei Tsubo).
 1708 (Hōei 5, 8th day of the 3rd month): There was a great fire in Heian-kyō.
 1708 (Hōei 5, 8th month):  Italian missionary Giovanni Sidotti landed in Yakushima, where he was promptly arrested.
 1709 (Hōei 6): Shōgun Tsunayoshi appoints commission to repair and restore Imperial mausoleums.
 1709 (Hōei 6, 4th month): Tokugawa Ienobu, Tsunayoshi's nephew, becomes the 6th shōgun of the Edo bakufu. and Emperor Nakamikado accedes to the throne.
 July 27, 1709 (Hōei 6, 21st day of the 6th month): Emperor Higashiyama abdicated and the throne passed to his son.
 January 16, 1710 (Hōei 6, 17th day of the 12th month): Higashiyama died.

Higashiyama is among those enshrined in the Imperial mausoleum, Tsuki no wa no misasagi, at Sennyū-ji in Higashiyama-ku, Kyoto.  Also enshrined in this location are this emperor's immediate Imperial predecessors since Emperor Go-Mizunoo – Meishō, Go-Kōmyō, Go-Sai and Reigen.  Higashiyama's immediate Imperial successors, including Nakamikado, Sakuramachi, Momozono, Go-Sakuramachi and Go-Momozono, are enshrined here as well.

Eras of reign
The years of Higashiyama's reign are more specifically identified by more than one era name or nengō.
 Jōkyō  (1684–1688)
 Genroku       (1688–1704)
 Hōei    (1704–1711)

Genealogy 
Higashiyama's family included at least 11 children.

Spouse

Concubines

Issue

Fictional portrayals
Higashiyama appears under the name of Tomohito in the novel The Samurai's Wife by author Laura Joh Rowland. In the novel, detective Sano Ichiro is sent to investigate the murder of an important official in the Imperial Court. Tomohito is labelled as a suspect, and is portrayed as a childish oaf at the start of the novel.  He is later revealed to be the instigator behind a coming revolution against the Tokugawa regime, so he can seize control of Japan himself. However, his plan fails, and he is once again placed in the Imperial Palace, where he seems to have accepted his fate to never leave the palace.

Ancestry

See also
 Emperor of Japan
 List of Emperors of Japan
 Imperial cult

References

Further reading
 Hammer, Joshua. (2006).  Yokohama Burning: the Deadly 1923 Earthquake and Fire that Helped Forge the Path to World War II.  New York: Simon & Schuster. ; 
 Meyer, Eva-Maria. (1999).  Japans Kaiserhof in der Edo-Zeit: unter besonderer Berücksichtigung der Jahre 1846 bis 1867.  Münster: LIT Verlag. 	; 
 Ponsonby-Fane, Richard Arthur Brabazon. (1956). Kyoto: The Old Capital of Japan, 794–1869. Kyoto: Ponsonby Memorial Society. 
 __. (1959). The Imperial House of Japan. Kyoto: Ponsonby Memorial Society. 
 Screech, Timon. (2006). Secret Memoirs of the Shoguns: Isaac Titsingh and Japan, 1779–1822. London: RoutledgeCurzon. ; 
 Smith, Robert and Richard K. Beardsley.  (2004). Japanese Culture: Its Development And Characteristics. Chicago, Aldine Publishing. 
 Titsingh, Isaac. (1834). Nihon Ōdai Ichiran; ou,  Annales des empereurs du Japon.  Paris: Royal Asiatic Society, Oriental Translation Fund of Great Britain and Ireland. 
 Traganeou, Jilly. (2004). The Tokaido Road: Traveling and Representation in Edo and Meiji Japan. New York: RoutledgeCurzon. ; 
 Varley, H. Paul. (1980). Jinnō Shōtōki: A Chronicle of Gods and Sovereigns. New York: Columbia University Press. ; 

Japanese emperors
1675 births
1710 deaths
Emperor Higashiyama
Emperor Higashiyama
Emperor Higashiyama
Emperor Higashiyama
Deaths from smallpox
Infectious disease deaths in Japan
17th-century Japanese monarchs
18th-century Japanese monarchs
Japanese retired emperors